Dichomeris evitata is a moth in the family Gelechiidae. It was described by Walsingham in 1911. It is found in Panama.

The forewings are dark greyish brown, with broad irregular broken lines of dark brown following the veins along the upper and lower edge of the cell, as well as above and beyond it. These form a spot-like shade a little before the termen below the apex, and another on the costa before the apex, the latter having a small pale costal spot at either extremity. The hindwings are umber-brown.

References

Moths described in 1911
evitata